The European Parliamentary Elections Act 2002 (c. 24) was an Act of the Parliament of the United Kingdom governing elections to the European Parliament.

The Act divided the United Kingdom into various regions to which were allocated a number of seats. England was divided into nine regions with a total of 71 seats, Scotland, Wales and Northern Ireland were divided into a single region each, with 8, 5 and 3 seats respectively and for the first time allowed the participation of Gibraltar which was placed within the South West England  constituency for the  purpose of the elections.

The Act was repealed by the European Union (Withdrawal) Act 2018 on 31 January 2020 with the 2019 European Parliament election being the last to be held under the former legislation.

2011 AV and 2016 EU referendums
The legal provisions for the appointment of "Regional returning officers" and also the twelve European Parliamentary Regional constituencies areas of the United Kingdom under this Act were also used under the titles of "Regional counting officers" and "Regional count areas" in the legislation enacted for the holding of both the 2011 AV Referendum under the Parliamentary Voting System and Constituencies Act 2011 and the 2016 EU Referendum under the European Union Referendum Act 2015.

Repeal 
As a result of the referendum on the United Kingdom's membership of the European Union on 23 June 2016, the act was repealed by the European Union (Withdrawal) Act 2018, however initially it was only partially repealed and was not fully repealed until 31 January 2020 when the United Kingdom formally left the European Union.<ref>The European Union (Withdrawal) Act 2018 (Commencement and Transitional Provisions) Regulations 2018.</ref>

See alsoMatthews v United Kingdom''
European Assembly Elections Act 1978
European Parliamentary Elections Act 1993
European Parliamentary Elections Act 1999
European Union Act 2011
European Communities Act 1972 (UK)
Acts of Parliament of the United Kingdom relating to the European Communities and the European Union

References

United Kingdom Acts of Parliament 2002
Gibraltar and the European Union
European Parliament elections in the United Kingdom
Election law in the United Kingdom
Acts of the Parliament of the United Kingdom relating to the European Union
Repealed United Kingdom Acts of Parliament